The 1993 Oceania Swimming Championships were held in Nouméa, New Caledonia, in February 1993. They were organised by Oceania Swimming Association.

Results

Men's events

Legend:

Women's events

Legend:

See also
1993 in swimming

References

Oceania Swimming Championships, 1993
Oceania Swimming Championships, 1993
Oceania
Oceania Swimming Championships
1993 in New Caledonia
International aquatics competitions hosted by New Caledonia
February 1993 sports events in Oceania